is a Japanese former football player and manager. He is the president of J2 League club Yokohama FC and was formerly the president of English club Plymouth Argyle. Okudera was the first Japanese footballer to play professionally in Europe, as well as being the first Asian football player to score in the European Cup, while playing for 1. FC Köln in the 1979 semi-final match against Nottingham Forest and made 32 appearances – scoring nine goals – with the Japan national team.

Club career
Okudera began his playing career in 1970 as an employee of Furukawa Electric, whose soccer team played in the corporate Japan Soccer League, the top flight league in Japan at the time. In 1976, the club won the 1976 Japan Soccer League and 1976 Emperor's Cup and he was selected Best Eleven. In May 1977, the club also won 1977 JSL Cup.

In the summer of 1977, during the team's trip to Germany, he was spotted by coach Hennes Weisweiler of Bundesliga club 1. FC Köln. After being offered a contract by Köln he joined the club in July 1977. Okudera made his debut on 5 October 1977, becoming the first Japanese player to play top flight football in Europe, and Köln won the Bundesliga title that year. On 20 December, he scored his first goal for Köln also achieving a brace in a 9–0 victory over Schwarz-Weiß Essen in the Quarter-final of the DFB-Pokal. On 8 April 1978, he scored his first goal in the Bundesliga in a 2–0 win against 1. FC Kaiserslautern. On 11 April 1979, Okudera scored a goal in a 3–3 draw against Nottingham Forest F.C. in the first leg of the semi-finals of the European Cup and he became the first Asian player to score in a European Cup match.

After Weisweiler left Cologne during the 1980–81 season, Okudera joined second division Hertha BSC. Hertha missed promotion to the first division losing a decisive match against Werder Bremen. He then joined the newly promoted Werder Bremen, whose coach Otto Rehhagel saw his play when the two sides met and offered a contract. Under Rehhagel, he started playing as an attacking full-back instead of as a winger and finished second in the league three times between 1981–82 and 1985–86 with Bremen.

In the summer of 1986, Okudera returned to his old Japanese club, Furukuwa Electric and became one of the first recognized professional players in JSL. On 26 December 1986, he scored a hat-trick in a 4–3 win over Al Hilal in the final round of the Asian Club Championship. He ended his German career with 234 appearances and 26 goals. He retired as a player in 1988.

International career
On 12 July 1972, Okudera debuted for Japan national team against Khmer. He played at 1976 Asian Cup qualification and 1978 World Cup qualification until 1977. While he played in Germany, he was not selected Japan national team from 1977 to 1986. In September 1986, when he was 34 years old, he returned to Japan and was selected Japan for 1986 Asian Games. In 1987, he also played at 1988 Summer Olympics qualification. This qualification was his last game for Japan. He played 32 games and scored 9 goals for Japan until 1987.

Post-playing career
Okudera's return home spurred the professionalization of the Japanese game, which had been stuck in amateur play for decades. He was the first native-born professional player in his home league, as before only foreigners (usually Brazilians) were paid strictly to play football by the companies.

After the J1 League started play in 1993, he served as the president and manager of Furukawa, which had become JEF United Ichihara with limited success. In 1998, he joined his Köln teammate Pierre Littbarski and helped form Yokohama FC. With Okudera as president and Littbarski the manager, Yokohama climbed up the ranks from the lower-tier Japan Football League and promoted to the J1 League in December 2006.

On 5 December 2003, Okudera and former South Korean star Cha Bum-kun were the Asian representatives at the preliminary draw, which determined the groupings for the qualifying matches for the 2006 World Cup.

On 20 June 2008, Okudera was appointed President of the Football League Championship side Plymouth Argyle tasked with playing a global ambassador role and further strengthening the club's profile in Asia. Since this appointment Argyle have suffered a relegation and serious financial difficulties. Okudera was replaced in his role by former Fans Trust leader Chris Webb, who had played a key part in rescuing Argyle from liquidation.

Okudera was selected Japan Football Hall of Fame in 2012 and Asian Football Hall of Fame in 2014.

In October 2017, Yokohama FC manager Hitoshi Nakata was sacked, Okudera managed the club as caretaker.

Career statistics

Club

International

Managerial statistics

Honours
Furukawa Electric
 Japan Soccer League: 1976
 Emperor's Cup: 1976
 Japanese Super Cup: 1977
 Asian Club Championship: 1986–87

1. FC Köln
 European Cup Semi-finals: 1978–79
 Bundesliga: 1977–78
 DFB-Pokal: 1977–78; runner-up: 1979–80

Werder Bremen
 Bundesliga runner-up: 1982–83, 1984–85, 1985–86

Japan
 Pestabola Merdeka runner-up: 1976

Individual
Japan Soccer League Best Eleven: 1976, 1986–87
Japan Football Hall of Fame: 2012
Asian Football Hall of Fame: 2014
IFFHS Asian Men's Team of All Time: 2021

References

External links
 
 Japan National Football Team Database

Japan Football Hall of Fame at Japan Football Association
 

1952 births
Living people
People from Kazuno, Akita
Association football people from Akita Prefecture
Japanese footballers
Japan international footballers
Japanese expatriate footballers
Japanese expatriate sportspeople in Germany
Expatriate footballers in Germany
Japan Soccer League players
Bundesliga players
2. Bundesliga players
JEF United Chiba players
1. FC Köln players
Hertha BSC players
SV Werder Bremen players
Japanese football managers
J1 League managers
J2 League managers
JEF United Chiba managers
Yokohama FC managers
Japanese football chairmen and investors
Footballers at the 1986 Asian Games
Association football midfielders
Asian Games competitors for Japan